The Cornelia B. Windiate was a schooner that sank in 1875 with all hands in Lake Huron off Presque Isle, Michigan, between Rogers City and Alpena.  The ship was eastbound from Milwaukee to Buffalo.  The reason for her sinking is unknown, but she departed November 27, late in the season, and was overloaded with grain.  There was no record of her passing through the Straits of Mackinac, so for years it was assumed she had foundered somewhere in Lake Michigan

The wreck is unique in that her cargo is still secure in her holds which is quite unusual for a wreck. Her masts are still standing with rigging.

References

 

Shipwrecks of Lake Huron
Ships lost with all hands
1874 ships
Wreck diving sites in the United States
1986 archaeological discoveries